The Métis Population Betterment Act was a 1938 act of the Alberta Legislature in Canada that created a committee of members of the Métis and the government to plot out lands for allocation to the Métis. Twelve areas were mapped out for this purpose, with the idea of creating ongoing cooperation between the Métis and Crown representatives toward the improvement of quality of life for the Métis. In 1940, however, certain revisions in the act's effects reduced the role of the Métis in their affairs, leaving them in charge of land occupation and timber, among several other things. Throughout the subsequent decade, the Métis received government funds to construct schools, roads, housing, engage in commercial fishing, and extracting timber. Meanwhile, it came to light that certain lands given to the Métis were insufficient to create a living for the people placed there, and these settlements were rescinded. By 1960, only eight of the original lands were still in the hands of the Métis.

See also
Métis in Alberta

Métis in Alberta
Alberta provincial legislation
Indigenous self-government in Canada
History of Indigenous peoples in Canada
History of Alberta
1938 in Canadian law
1938 in Alberta